Jud Tylor (born March 24, 1979) is a Canadian television and film actress. She has had recurring roles in a number of television programs including That '70s Show and Edgemont.

Career
Tylor was born on March 24, 1979 in Vancouver, British Columbia. She has had recurring roles in a number of television programs and films including the hit series That '70s Show (2005) as the sexy Samantha and a supporting lead alongside Academy award winner Tom Hanks and Julia Roberts in Charlie Wilson's War (2007). Most recently Jud can be seen portraying Laraine Day alongside Chadwick Boseman in the Jackie Robinson story 42 (2013). Jud won critical acclaim for her portrayal of Suzanne Somers in Behind the Camera: The Unauthorized Story of Three's Company (2003) and was nominated in 2013 for best Canadian actress by the Canadian Screen Awards for her series regular role on HBO's Good God (2012).

Filmography

Film

Television

External links

1979 births
Actresses from Vancouver
Canadian film actresses
Canadian television actresses
Living people
20th-century Canadian actresses
21st-century Canadian actresses